Ends of the Earth may refer to:

 Extreme points of Earth
 "Ends of the Earth" (DC Comics), a Wonder Woman story line
 "Ends of the Earth" (Marvel Comics), a Spider-Man story line
 The Ends of the Earth (novel), a novel by Valerio Massimo Manfredi
 The Ends of the Earth (short story collection), a story collection by Lucius Shepard
 The Ends of the Earth (play), by Morris Panych
 "Ends of the Earth," a song by Lord Huron from their 2012 album Lonesome Dreams
 "Ends of the Earth," a song by Dirty Three from their 1998 album Ocean Songs

See also
 End of the Earth (disambiguation)
 To the Ends of the Earth (disambiguation)
 End of the world (disambiguation)